Lucien Degauchy (11 June 1937 – 11 February 2022) was a member of the National Assembly of France from 1993 to 2017.  He represented the Oise department, and was a member of the Union for a Popular Movement. Born in France, he died on 11 February 2022, at the age of 84.

References

1937 births
2022 deaths
People from Oise
Union for a Popular Movement politicians
Rally for the Republic politicians
The Republicans (France) politicians
Deputies of the 10th National Assembly of the French Fifth Republic
Deputies of the 12th National Assembly of the French Fifth Republic
Deputies of the 13th National Assembly of the French Fifth Republic
Deputies of the 14th National Assembly of the French Fifth Republic